Yash is a 1996 Indian Bollywood musical film directed by Sharad Saran. It stars Bijay Anand, Kartika Rane, Dilip Dhawan, Mangal Dhillon, Dina Pathak, Parikshat Sahni, Ajit Vachani and Sonu Walia. Its songs "Subah Subah Jab Khidki Khole" and "Yaaron Na Jane Mujhe Kya Ho Gaya" went on to become surprise chartbusters at the time, giving instant fame to its debutant composer Tabun (who later worked on Yaadein) and its lyricist Mehboob Kotwal. The film bombed badly at the box office since it was never intended to be made into a full-length feature film until the songs became a rage. The film was a box office failure.

Synopsis
Vikram Rai (Mangal Dhillon) is a talented singer, unknown however in the singing world. Kalpana (Sonu Walia), the daughter of Kailashnath Sahai (Ajit Vachani) who is the owner of a singing company, is however won over by his singing and marries him against her father's wishes. They have a son whom they name Yash (Bijay Anand). As time passes Kalpana realises that she has married the wrong man. She leaves her husband and son and returns to her father's house. Kalpana's desertion is a real challenge for Vikram and after sending Yash to a hostel, he works hard and eventually becomes the owner of a company. Yash turns out to be a handsome young man in love with a girl, Angel (Kartika Rane), who is the daughter of a music teacher. Yash now feels rejected by both his parents - his mother who is more in love with money and his father who has fallen in love with Asha (Natasha Sinha). After taking training in music from Mr. Joseph, he becomes a pop singer and gets a lot of fame. Seeing this, his mother and grandfather wish to bring him into their company, but he refuses. In order to take revenge, Kailashnath destroys Vikram. When Yash learns of this, he comes to his father's help. Is Yash able to re-establish his father? Iss he able to bring his parents together? This is the climax of Yash.

Cast

 Bijay Anand as Yash Rai
 Kartika Rane as Angel
 Sonu Walia as Mrs. Kalpana Rai
 Mangal Dhillon as Vikram Rai
 Ajit Vachani as Kailashnath Sahay
 Dina Pathak as Daadima
 Dilip Joshi as Gopi
 Mushtaq Khan as Sharafat Ali
 Prithvi Zutshi as Gautam Kumar Verma
 Parikshat Sahni as R.K. Joseph 
 Dilip Dhawan as Balraj Sahay
Mulraj Rajda as Postman (Uncredited)

Soundtrack
The songs were composed by Tabun Sutradhar.

References

External links
 

1996 films
1990s Hindi-language films